State Route 145 (SR 145) is part of Maine's system of numbered state highways.  It runs  from an intersection with SR 4 in Strong to an intersection with SR 142 near Kingfield. The route is also known as Main Street in Strong.

Major junctions

References

External links

Floodgap Roadgap's RoadsAroundME: Maine State Route 145

145
Transportation in Franklin County, Maine